Ramiro Vargas Espinoza (born 22 October 1958) is a Bolivian former footballer who played as a defender. He played in 21 matches for the Bolivia national football team from 1979 to 1989. He was also part of Bolivia's squad for the 1979 Copa América and the 1983 Copa América tournaments.

References

External links
 

1958 births
Living people
Bolivian footballers
Bolivia international footballers
Association football defenders
Footballers from La Paz
1979 Copa América players
1983 Copa América players
Club San José managers
Independiente Petrolero managers
La Paz F.C. managers